Liasis mackloti savuensis, known as the  Savu python, is a python subspecies found in Indonesia. It is known by the locals as sanca mata putih (white-eyed python).

Distribution and habitat
The type locality given is "Savu Id." (=Sawoe, Indonesia).

See also
 Daletvirus boae

References

External links
 

mackloti savuensis
Taxa named by Leo Brongersma